Burbank is a city in Cook County, Illinois, United States. The population was 29,439 at the 2020 census. It is located at the southwest edge of the city of Chicago; the Chicago city limit – specifically that of the Ashburn neighborhood – is in common with Burbank's eastern city limit. Burbank shares a boundary with Oak Lawn to its south, Bridgeview to its west, and Bedford Park to its north; the city of Hometown is also adjacent to Burbank's southeast corner. Burbank is less than two miles south of Chicago Midway International Airport.

History
In 1850, the area which would become the city of Burbank, then largely uninhabited and agrarian, became part of Lyons Township. Over the next hundred years the area remained largely undeveloped, though several times large plans were laid out for the area, never to come to fruition. In the late 19th century a railroad investor named A. B. Stickney planned a large railroad transfer center which included what became the northern part of Burbank, but his ideas were never realized due to an economic depression in 1893.

In the 1920s, the area became an attractive site for real-estate developers who bought up farmland and built subdivisions. However, ongoing drainage problems, practically nonexistent water and sewage systems and the Great Depression kept Burbank largely unbuilt and empty until the 1950s.

In 1952, the area became part of Stickney Township. Though still unincorporated, this led to massive development in the area, and by 1960 the population of the area had reached 20,720, nearly triple the population of a decade earlier. The area was incorporated into a city in 1970, partly to resist annexation by the City of Chicago. The city was named after Luther Burbank Elementary School, an institution which had served the area since the 1930s. The area's population peaked in 1976 at 29,448.

Law and government
Burbank has been in Illinois's 3rd congressional district since 1983. The city was in the 4th District from 1973 to 1983, prior to which the area had been in the 5th District since the 1940s.

Geography

Demographics

As of the 2020 census there were 29,439 people, 9,108 households, and 6,823 families residing in the city. The racial makeup of the city was 60.35% White, 1.93% African American, 1.59% Native American, 3.13% Asian, 0.03% Pacific Islander, 17.37% from other races, and 15.60% from two or more races. Hispanic or Latino of any race were 39.57% of the population.

There were 9,108 households, out of which 71.75% had children under the age of 18 living with them, 54.96% were married couples living together, 12.15% had a female householder with no husband present, and 25.09% were non-families. 23.20% of all households were made up of individuals, and 10.13% had someone living alone who was 65 years of age or older. The average household size was 3.65 and the average family size was 3.10.

The city's age distribution consisted of 25.8% under the age of 18, 8.8% from 18 to 24, 26.2% from 25 to 44, 25% from 45 to 64, and 14.2% who were 65 years of age or older. The median age was 37.8 years. For every 100 females, there were 108.0 males. For every 100 females age 18 and over, there were 105.6 males.

The median income for a household in the city was $70,052, and the median income for a family was $79,422. Males had a median income of $44,447 versus $31,477 for females. The per capita income for the city was $27,505. About 8.3% of families and 10.7% of the population were below the poverty line, including 19.1% of those under age 18 and 6.3% of those age 65 or over.

Note: the US Census treats Hispanic/Latino as an ethnic category. This table excludes Latinos from the racial categories and assigns them to a separate category. Hispanics/Latinos can be of any race.

See also
Reavis High School
Queen of Peace High School
St. Laurence High School

References

External links 
 

 
Chicago metropolitan area
Cities in Illinois
Cities in Cook County, Illinois
Populated places established in 1970
1970 establishments in Illinois